Marliac is a commune in the Haute-Garonne department in southwestern France.

Geography
The commune is bordered by six communes, one in Haute-Garonne, and five in Ariège: Gaillac-Toulza to the northwest, and finally by the department of Ariège to the northeast, east, southeast, south, and southwest by the communes of Canté, Brie, Justiniac, Durfort, and Villeneuve-du-Latou.

Population

See also
Communes of the Haute-Garonne department

References

Communes of Haute-Garonne